Nicetiodes is a monotypic snout moth genus described by William Schaus in 1923. Its only species, Nicetiodes apianella, described in the same article, is found on the Galápagos Islands.

References

Moths described in 1923
Phycitinae
Monotypic moth genera
Moths of South America